Lorandersonia, commonly called rabbitbush, is a genus of North American flowering plants in the family Asteraceae.

The genus is named for American botanist Loran Crittenden Anderson of Florida State University.

 Species
 Lorandersonia baileyi (Wooton & Standl.) Urbatsch, R.P.Roberts & Neubig – northern Mexico (Chihuahua, Coahuila, Nuevo León) + Southwestern United States (Arizona New Mexico Texas Oklahoma Kansas Colorado Utah)
 Lorandersonia linifolia (Greene) Urbatsch, R.P.Roberts & Neubig – Arizona New Mexico Colorado Utah Wyoming Montana
 Lorandersonia microcephala (Cronquist) Urbatsch, R.P.Roberts & Neubig – New Mexico (Taos + Rio Arriba Cos), southern Colorado
 Lorandersonia peirsonii (D.D.Keck) Urbatsch, R.P.Roberts & Neubig – Sierra Nevada in California (Inyo, Mono, Fresno Cos)
 Lorandersonia pulchella (A.Gray) Urbatsch, R.P.Roberts & Neubig – Chihuahua, Coahuila, Texas New Mexico 
 Lorandersonia salicina (S.F.Blake) Urbatsch, R.P.Roberts & Neubig – Nevada (Clark Co), Arizona (Mohave + Yavapai Cos)
 Lorandersonia spathulata (L.C.Anderson) Urbatsch, R.P.Roberts & Neubig – Texas New Mexico

References

Astereae
Flora of North America
Asteraceae genera